Carl Ludwig Grotefend (22 December 1807 – 27 October 1874) was a German epigraphist, philologist and numismat. He played a key role in the decipherment of the Indian Kharoshthi script on the coinage of the Indo-Greek kings, around the same time as James Prinsep, publishing Die unbekannte Schrift der Baktrischen Münzen ("The unknown script of the Bactrian coins") in 1836. He was the son of the famous philologist Georg Friedrich Grotefend, who made the first successful attempts at deciphering Old Persian cuneiform.

It is thought that Carl Ludwig Grotefend independently accomplished the first decipherment of the Kharoshthi script  (1836, in Blatter fur Munzkunde, Germany) around the same time as Prinsep (1835, in the Journal of the Asiatic society of Bengal, India), as Grotefend was "evidently not aware of the latter's article".

In 1839, he wrote Die Münzen der griechischen, parthischen und indoskythischen Könige von Baktrien und den Ländern am Indus ("The coins of the Greek, Parthian and Indo-Scythian kings of Bactria and the countries on the Indus").

Works

References

German philologists
Members of the Göttingen Academy of Sciences and Humanities
1807 births
1874 deaths